Alessandro "Sandro" Melli (born 11 December 1969) is an Italian former footballer who played as a striker. He won five team honours in his professional career.

Club career
Melli's father was a professional footballer, playing as a centre forward for Parma AC, and the son followed in his footsteps. He made his Parma debut aged 17, and was part of the team that was promoted from the third to the top level.

After a loan spell at Modena F.C. that was cut short when he fell out with coach Paolo Ferrari, Melli returned to Parma, quickly establishing himself in Parma's first team in the early 1990s, in what was a golden period for the club. As part of that ducali squad, he won an Italian Cup in 1991–92, and a UEFA Cup Winners' Cup in the following season (in the final of which he scored), being part of an attacking line-up that featured also Faustino Asprilla, Tomas Brolin and Gianfranco Zola.

Melli left Parma in 1994, spending six months each at U.C. Sampdoria and A.C. Milan (who swapped Ruud Gullit for him), before returning to the Ennio Tardini after a year away. This lasted two years, but he did not manage to recapture his old form. In total, Melli scored 56 goals in 241 games for Parma.

He was transferred to Serie B side Perugia Calcio in 1997, where he immediately won promotion to the first division. He left Perugia in 2000, and ended his career with a season spell at A.C. Ancona.

After retiring, Melli eventually rejoined former side Parma's non-playing staff, serving as general manager.

International career
During Parma's heyday, Melli was awarded with two caps for Italy, which came in the team's 1994 FIFA World Cup qualifiers against Malta and Estonia.

Previously, in 1992, he appeared at the Summer Olympics, netting in two group stage wins as Italy was eventually ousted by champions Spain, and helped the U21s win the UEFA European Championship.

Honours

Club
Parma
UEFA Cup Winners' Cup: 1992–93
UEFA Super Cup: 1993
Coppa Italia: 1991–92

Milan
UEFA Super Cup: 1994

International
Italy U-21
UEFA European Under-21 Football Championship: 1992

References

External links

National team data  

1969 births
Living people
People from Agrigento
Italian footballers
Association football forwards
Serie A players
Serie B players
Serie C players
Parma Calcio 1913 players
Modena F.C. players
U.C. Sampdoria players
A.C. Milan players
A.C. Perugia Calcio players
A.C. Ancona players
Italy international footballers
Italy under-21 international footballers
Italy youth international footballers
Olympic footballers of Italy
Footballers at the 1992 Summer Olympics
Footballers from Sicily
Sportspeople from the Province of Agrigento